This is a partial list of unnumbered minor planets for principal provisional designations assigned during 1–15 October 2004. Since this period yielded a high number of provisional discoveries, it is further split into several standalone pages. , a total of 347 bodies remain unnumbered for this period. Objects for this year are listed on the following pages: A–B · C · D–E · F · G–H · J–O · P–Q · Ri · Rii · Riii · S · Ti · Tii · Tiii · Tiv · U–V · W–X and Y. Also see previous and next year.

T 

|- id="2004 TC" bgcolor=#E9E9E9
| 0 || 2004 TC || MBA-M || 17.69 || 1.2 km || multiple || 2004–2021 || 06 Aug 2021 || 61 || align=left | Disc.: NEATAlt.: 2010 CV102 || 
|- id="2004 TD" bgcolor=#fefefe
| 1 || 2004 TD || HUN || 17.8 || data-sort-value="0.82" | 820 m || multiple || 2004–2020 || 16 Nov 2020 || 122 || align=left | Disc.: NEAT || 
|- id="2004 TO" bgcolor=#fefefe
| 1 || 2004 TO || MBA-I || 18.5 || data-sort-value="0.59" | 590 m || multiple || 2000–2019 || 01 Nov 2019 || 43 || align=left | Disc.: Spacewatch || 
|- id="2004 TA1" bgcolor=#FFC2E0
| 4 ||  || ATE || 23.0 || data-sort-value="0.089" | 89 m || multiple || 2004–2017 || 24 Sep 2017 || 42 || align=left | Disc.: LONEOS || 
|- id="2004 TN1" bgcolor=#FFC2E0
| 5 ||  || APO || 21.8 || data-sort-value="0.16" | 160 m || single || 30 days || 04 Nov 2004 || 63 || align=left | Disc.: NEATPotentially hazardous object || 
|- id="2004 TO1" bgcolor=#FA8072
| 2 ||  || MCA || 19.5 || data-sort-value="0.53" | 530 m || multiple || 2004–2017 || 09 Dec 2017 || 71 || align=left | Disc.: LONEOS || 
|- id="2004 TP1" bgcolor=#FFC2E0
| 1 ||  || APO || 20.7 || data-sort-value="0.26" | 260 m || multiple || 2004–2021 || 12 May 2021 || 430 || align=left | Disc.: LONEOSPotentially hazardous object || 
|- id="2004 TX2" bgcolor=#E9E9E9
| 1 ||  || MBA-M || 19.57 || data-sort-value="0.51" | 510 m || multiple || 2004–2021 || 07 Nov 2021 || 58 || align=left | Disc.: Spacewatch || 
|- id="2004 TZ2" bgcolor=#fefefe
| 1 ||  || MBA-I || 18.8 || data-sort-value="0.52" | 520 m || multiple || 2004–2017 || 12 Sep 2017 || 60 || align=left | Disc.: SpacewatchAlt.: 2014 SX292 || 
|- id="2004 TC3" bgcolor=#fefefe
| 1 ||  || MBA-I || 19.0 || data-sort-value="0.47" | 470 m || multiple || 2004–2020 || 27 Feb 2020 || 30 || align=left | Disc.: Spacewatch || 
|- id="2004 TJ3" bgcolor=#fefefe
| 3 ||  || MBA-I || 19.1 || data-sort-value="0.45" | 450 m || multiple || 2004–2021 || 18 Jan 2021 || 30 || align=left | Disc.: LPL/Spacewatch IIAlt.: 2012 XA39 || 
|- id="2004 TM3" bgcolor=#d6d6d6
| 3 ||  || MBA-O || 18.0 || 1.4 km || multiple || 2004–2019 || 03 Oct 2019 || 88 || align=left | Disc.: Spacewatch IIAlt.: 2009 RV20 || 
|- id="2004 TN3" bgcolor=#d6d6d6
| – ||  || MBA-O || 18.0 || 1.4 km || single || 11 days || 15 Oct 2004 || 12 || align=left | Disc.: Spacewatch II || 
|- id="2004 TQ3" bgcolor=#d6d6d6
| 0 ||  || MBA-O || 17.2 || 2.0 km || multiple || 2002–2021 || 30 Nov 2021 || 64 || align=left | Disc.: LPL/Spacewatch IIAdded on 24 December 2021 || 
|- id="2004 TR3" bgcolor=#fefefe
| 0 ||  || MBA-I || 18.4 || data-sort-value="0.62" | 620 m || multiple || 2004–2019 || 19 Dec 2019 || 90 || align=left | Disc.: Spacewatch IIAlt.: 2013 CV30, 2015 TP217 || 
|- id="2004 TS3" bgcolor=#d6d6d6
| 0 ||  || MBA-O || 16.98 || 2.2 km || multiple || 2004–2021 || 03 Dec 2021 || 87 || align=left | Disc.: Spacewatch IIAlt.: 2015 SF14 || 
|- id="2004 TZ3" bgcolor=#fefefe
| – ||  || MBA-I || 19.3 || data-sort-value="0.41" | 410 m || single || 11 days || 15 Oct 2004 || 15 || align=left | Disc.: Spacewatch II || 
|- id="2004 TA4" bgcolor=#d6d6d6
| 0 ||  || MBA-O || 17.0 || 2.2 km || multiple || 2004–2021 || 06 Jan 2021 || 82 || align=left | Disc.: Spacewatch IIAlt.: 2015 XG61 || 
|- id="2004 TL4" bgcolor=#fefefe
| 2 ||  || MBA-I || 19.0 || data-sort-value="0.47" | 470 m || multiple || 2004–2018 || 06 Aug 2018 || 38 || align=left | Disc.: Spacewatch || 
|- id="2004 TE5" bgcolor=#E9E9E9
| 0 ||  || MBA-M || 16.8 || 2.4 km || multiple || 2004–2020 || 22 Apr 2020 || 59 || align=left | Disc.: SpacewatchAlt.: 2015 AH26 || 
|- id="2004 TO5" bgcolor=#E9E9E9
| 0 ||  || MBA-M || 17.91 || 1.1 km || multiple || 2004–2021 || 30 Nov 2021 || 80 || align=left | Disc.: Spacewatch || 
|- id="2004 TS5" bgcolor=#d6d6d6
| 0 ||  || MBA-O || 16.6 || 2.7 km || multiple || 2004–2020 || 11 Dec 2020 || 74 || align=left | Disc.: LPL/Spacewatch II || 
|- id="2004 TU5" bgcolor=#E9E9E9
| – ||  || MBA-M || 18.0 || data-sort-value="0.75" | 750 m || single || 25 days || 12 Oct 2004 || 15 || align=left | Disc.: Spacewatch || 
|- id="2004 TY5" bgcolor=#E9E9E9
| 0 ||  || MBA-M || 17.78 || 1.2 km || multiple || 2004–2021 || 27 Nov 2021 || 77 || align=left | Disc.: Spacewatch || 
|- id="2004 TB6" bgcolor=#d6d6d6
| – ||  || MBA-O || 17.2 || 2.0 km || single || 3 days || 08 Oct 2004 || 12 || align=left | Disc.: LPL/Spacewatch II || 
|- id="2004 TC6" bgcolor=#d6d6d6
| 0 ||  || MBA-O || 17.1 || 2.1 km || multiple || 2004–2020 || 18 Sep 2020 || 56 || align=left | Disc.: LPL/Spacewatch IIAdded on 22 July 2020Alt.: 2015 TU335 || 
|- id="2004 TD6" bgcolor=#E9E9E9
| – ||  || MBA-M || 18.4 || 1.2 km || single || 7 days || 12 Oct 2004 || 9 || align=left | Disc.: LPL/Spacewatch II || 
|- id="2004 TE6" bgcolor=#E9E9E9
| – ||  || MBA-M || 19.8 || data-sort-value="0.61" | 610 m || single || 4 days || 09 Oct 2004 || 9 || align=left | Disc.: LPL/Spacewatch II || 
|- id="2004 TZ7" bgcolor=#E9E9E9
| 0 ||  || MBA-M || 16.7 || 2.5 km || multiple || 2002–2020 || 20 May 2020 || 305 || align=left | Disc.: Astronomical Research Obs.Alt.: 2009 WZ254, 2011 FH62 || 
|- id="2004 TC8" bgcolor=#E9E9E9
| 0 ||  || MBA-M || 16.92 || 1.7 km || multiple || 2004–2022 || 22 Jan 2022 || 215 || align=left | Disc.: Goodricke-Pigott Obs. || 
|- id="2004 TD8" bgcolor=#FA8072
| 2 ||  || MCA || 19.9 || data-sort-value="0.31" | 310 m || multiple || 2004–2020 || 17 Jun 2020 || 49 || align=left | Disc.: Spacewatch || 
|- id="2004 TE8" bgcolor=#FFC2E0
| 3 ||  || APO || 19.4 || data-sort-value="0.47" | 470 m || multiple || 2004–2018 || 03 Jan 2018 || 53 || align=left | Disc.: Spacewatch || 
|- id="2004 TA9" bgcolor=#FA8072
| – ||  || MCA || 21.6 || data-sort-value="0.27" | 270 m || single || 6 days || 12 Oct 2004 || 21 || align=left | Disc.: Spacewatch || 
|- id="2004 TE9" bgcolor=#fefefe
| 1 ||  || MBA-I || 17.4 || data-sort-value="0.98" | 980 m || multiple || 2004–2020 || 17 Mar 2020 || 62 || align=left | Disc.: Spacewatch || 
|- id="2004 TG9" bgcolor=#E9E9E9
| – ||  || MBA-M || 18.1 || data-sort-value="0.71" | 710 m || single || 7 days || 12 Oct 2004 || 12 || align=left | Disc.: Spacewatch || 
|- id="2004 TH9" bgcolor=#E9E9E9
| 0 ||  || MBA-M || 17.86 || 1.1 km || multiple || 2000–2021 || 12 Sep 2021 || 73 || align=left | Disc.: Table Mountain Obs.Alt.: 2013 WC34 || 
|- id="2004 TL9" bgcolor=#fefefe
| 0 ||  || MBA-I || 17.64 || data-sort-value="0.88" | 880 m || multiple || 2004–2021 || 19 Apr 2021 || 141 || align=left | Disc.: Three Buttes Obs.Alt.: 2008 WM82, 2013 BD50 || 
|- id="2004 TQ9" bgcolor=#FA8072
| 0 ||  || HUN || 19.13 || data-sort-value="0.44" | 440 m || multiple || 2004–2021 || 15 Aug 2021 || 113 || align=left | Disc.: LINEARAlt.: 2018 SW2 || 
|- id="2004 TU9" bgcolor=#fefefe
| 0 ||  || HUN || 19.4 || data-sort-value="0.39" | 390 m || multiple || 2003–2017 || 29 Sep 2017 || 26 || align=left | Disc.: Spacewatch || 
|- id="2004 TV9" bgcolor=#E9E9E9
| 0 ||  || MBA-M || 17.2 || 2.0 km || multiple || 2004–2020 || 19 Apr 2020 || 52 || align=left | Disc.: Spacewatch || 
|- id="2004 TB10" bgcolor=#FFC2E0
| 2 ||  || APO || 21.4 || data-sort-value="0.19" | 190 m || multiple || 2004–2019 || 02 Apr 2019 || 123 || align=left | Disc.: LINEARPotentially hazardous object || 
|- id="2004 TD10" bgcolor=#FFC2E0
| 3 ||  || ATE || 22.1 || data-sort-value="0.14" | 140 m || multiple || 2004–2019 || 25 Sep 2019 || 166 || align=left | Disc.: LINEAR || 
|- id="2004 TE10" bgcolor=#FFC2E0
| 1 ||  || APO || 24.0 || data-sort-value="0.056" | 56 m || multiple || 2004–2016 || 11 Jun 2016 || 105 || align=left | Disc.: LINEARAlt.: 2016 LH11 || 
|- id="2004 TF10" bgcolor=#FFC2E0
| 1 ||  || APO || 20.94 || data-sort-value="0.23" | 230 m || multiple || 2004–2021 || 25 Nov 2021 || 57 || align=left | Disc.: LINEAR || 
|- id="2004 TG10" bgcolor=#FFC2E0
| 1 ||  || APO || 19.4 || 1.3 km || multiple || 2004–2018 || 24 Jul 2018 || 90 || align=left | Disc.: SpacewatchPotentially hazardous object || 
|- id="2004 TJ10" bgcolor=#FFC2E0
| 7 ||  || APO || 25.1 || data-sort-value="0.034" | 34 m || single || 1 day || 09 Oct 2004 || 32 || align=left | Disc.: Spacewatch || 
|- id="2004 TL10" bgcolor=#FFC2E0
| 1 ||  || APO || 21.3 || data-sort-value="0.20" | 200 m || multiple || 2004–2017 || 16 Nov 2017 || 99 || align=left | Disc.: LINEARPotentially hazardous object || 
|- id="2004 TG11" bgcolor=#FA8072
| 1 ||  || MCA || 18.3 || data-sort-value="0.65" | 650 m || multiple || 2004–2018 || 12 Dec 2018 || 101 || align=left | Disc.: LINEARAlt.: 2016 ET156 || 
|- id="2004 TM11" bgcolor=#fefefe
| 1 ||  || MBA-I || 18.1 || data-sort-value="0.71" | 710 m || multiple || 2002–2020 || 21 Apr 2020 || 149 || align=left | Disc.: Goodricke-Pigott Obs.Alt.: 2008 YQ107, 2011 UF419, 2018 RS33 || 
|- id="2004 TP11" bgcolor=#FA8072
| – ||  || MCA || 19.8 || data-sort-value="0.33" | 330 m || single || 8 days || 12 Oct 2004 || 35 || align=left | Disc.: LINEAR || 
|- id="2004 TU11" bgcolor=#FFC2E0
| 0 ||  || AMO || 21.1 || data-sort-value="0.21" | 210 m || multiple || 2004–2013 || 20 Jan 2013 || 139 || align=left | Disc.: LONEOS || 
|- id="2004 TV11" bgcolor=#FFC2E0
| 7 ||  || AMO || 24.4 || data-sort-value="0.047" | 47 m || single || 12 days || 21 Oct 2004 || 29 || align=left | Disc.: Spacewatch || 
|- id="2004 TW11" bgcolor=#FFC2E0
| 6 ||  || APO || 24.0 || data-sort-value="0.056" | 56 m || single || 31 days || 09 Nov 2004 || 70 || align=left | Disc.: LONEOSAMO at MPC || 
|- id="2004 TK12" bgcolor=#FA8072
| 0 ||  || MCA || 18.23 || 1.3 km || multiple || 2004–2019 || 10 Jan 2019 || 171 || align=left | Disc.: Spacewatch || 
|- id="2004 TN12" bgcolor=#FA8072
| 0 ||  || HUN || 18.20 || data-sort-value="0.68" | 680 m || multiple || 1999–2021 || 03 Dec 2021 || 144 || align=left | Disc.: LINEARAlt.: 1999 VC87 || 
|- id="2004 TQ12" bgcolor=#FA8072
| 1 ||  || MCA || 18.7 || data-sort-value="0.54" | 540 m || multiple || 2004–2020 || 17 Dec 2020 || 228 || align=left | Disc.: LINEARAlt.: 2010 PA15, 2010 PT19 || 
|- id="2004 TS12" bgcolor=#FA8072
| 1 ||  || MCA || 17.6 || 1.7 km || multiple || 2000–2020 || 23 Dec 2020 || 79 || align=left | Disc.: LINEAR || 
|- id="2004 TT12" bgcolor=#FFC2E0
| 6 ||  || AMO || 24.0 || data-sort-value="0.056" | 56 m || single || 45 days || 18 Nov 2004 || 24 || align=left | Disc.: Spacewatch || 
|- id="2004 TF13" bgcolor=#fefefe
| 1 ||  || HUN || 18.4 || data-sort-value="0.62" | 620 m || multiple || 2004–2020 || 17 Feb 2020 || 118 || align=left | Disc.: NEAT || 
|- id="2004 TP13" bgcolor=#FFC2E0
| 9 ||  || ATE || 23.1 || data-sort-value="0.085" | 85 m || single || 7 days || 15 Oct 2004 || 23 || align=left | Disc.: LINEAR || 
|- id="2004 TZ13" bgcolor=#FA8072
| 1 ||  || MCA || 18.4 || data-sort-value="0.62" | 620 m || multiple || 2004–2019 || 24 Oct 2019 || 89 || align=left | Disc.: LINEAR || 
|- id="2004 TK14" bgcolor=#FFC2E0
| 2 ||  || AMO || 20.1 || data-sort-value="0.34" | 340 m || multiple || 2004–2006 || 30 Sep 2006 || 57 || align=left | Disc.: LONEOS || 
|- id="2004 TL14" bgcolor=#FA8072
| 0 ||  || MCA || 18.06 || data-sort-value="0.73" | 730 m || multiple || 2004–2021 || 27 Nov 2021 || 156 || align=left | Disc.: LINEARAdded on 21 August 2021 || 
|- id="2004 TP14" bgcolor=#FA8072
| 0 ||  || HUN || 18.22 || data-sort-value="0.67" | 670 m || multiple || 1999–2021 || 28 Oct 2021 || 247 || align=left | Disc.: LINEARAlt.: 1999 UH39 || 
|- id="2004 TU14" bgcolor=#E9E9E9
| 0 ||  || MBA-M || 17.40 || 1.8 km || multiple || 2004–2021 || 09 May 2021 || 67 || align=left | Disc.: LINEARAlt.: 2010 FU130, 2016 GS119 || 
|- id="2004 TA15" bgcolor=#E9E9E9
| – ||  || MBA-M || 19.0 || data-sort-value="0.67" | 670 m || single || 8 days || 15 Oct 2004 || 14 || align=left | Disc.: Spacewatch || 
|- id="2004 TC15" bgcolor=#E9E9E9
| 0 ||  || MBA-M || 17.55 || 1.3 km || multiple || 2004–2022 || 25 Jan 2022 || 122 || align=left | Disc.: LINEARAlt.: 2008 SU68 || 
|- id="2004 TK15" bgcolor=#d6d6d6
| 0 ||  || MBA-O || 16.95 || 2.3 km || multiple || 2004–2022 || 27 Jan 2022 || 115 || align=left | Disc.: LINEARAlt.: 2020 PG11 || 
|- id="2004 TV15" bgcolor=#E9E9E9
| 0 ||  || MBA-M || 17.82 || 1.1 km || multiple || 2004–2021 || 30 Oct 2021 || 119 || align=left | Disc.: LONEOS || 
|- id="2004 TX15" bgcolor=#E9E9E9
| 0 ||  || MBA-M || 17.59 || data-sort-value="0.90" | 900 m || multiple || 2004–2022 || 22 Jan 2022 || 94 || align=left | Disc.: Spacewatch || 
|- id="2004 TD16" bgcolor=#FA8072
| 2 ||  || MCA || 19.1 || data-sort-value="0.64" | 640 m || multiple || 2004–2017 || 10 Oct 2017 || 33 || align=left | Disc.: LINEARAlt.: 2017 QE81 || 
|- id="2004 TA17" bgcolor=#d6d6d6
| 0 ||  || MBA-O || 16.30 || 3.1 km || multiple || 2004–2021 || 13 Dec 2021 || 135 || align=left | Disc.: LINEAR || 
|- id="2004 TC17" bgcolor=#E9E9E9
| 2 ||  || MBA-M || 17.1 || 1.6 km || multiple || 2004–2020 || 27 Apr 2020 || 58 || align=left | Disc.: NEAT || 
|- id="2004 TK17" bgcolor=#FA8072
| 1 ||  || MCA || 19.3 || data-sort-value="0.41" | 410 m || multiple || 2004–2020 || 15 Sep 2020 || 43 || align=left | Disc.: Spacewatch || 
|- id="2004 TC18" bgcolor=#FFC2E0
| 7 ||  || APO || 24.0 || data-sort-value="0.056" | 56 m || single || 8 days || 20 Oct 2004 || 32 || align=left | Disc.: LINEAR || 
|- id="2004 TD18" bgcolor=#FFC2E0
| 7 ||  || APO || 22.2 || data-sort-value="0.13" | 130 m || single || 35 days || 11 Nov 2004 || 39 || align=left | Disc.: Spacewatch || 
|- id="2004 TE18" bgcolor=#FFC2E0
| 5 ||  || AMO || 21.2 || data-sort-value="0.20" | 200 m || single || 37 days || 20 Nov 2004 || 26 || align=left | Disc.: LONEOS || 
|- id="2004 TF18" bgcolor=#FA8072
| 1 ||  || MCA || 19.1 || data-sort-value="0.88" | 860 m || multiple || 2004-2022 || 02 Dec 2022 || 61 || align=left | Disc.: NEAT Alt.: 2022 QA7 || 
|- id="2004 TO18" bgcolor=#FA8072
| 1 ||  || MCA || 18.6 || data-sort-value="0.57" | 570 m || multiple || 2004–2017 || 13 Nov 2017 || 102 || align=left | Disc.: Goodricke-Pigott Obs.Alt.: 2015 BX207 || 
|- id="2004 TB19" bgcolor=#d6d6d6
| 0 ||  || MBA-O || 16.93 || 2.3 km || multiple || 2004–2022 || 05 Jan 2022 || 59 || align=left | Disc.: LINEARAlt.: 2015 TX260 || 
|- id="2004 TH20" bgcolor=#E9E9E9
| 0 ||  || MBA-M || 17.88 || data-sort-value="0.79" | 790 m || multiple || 2004–2021 || 05 Dec 2021 || 69 || align=left | Disc.: LINEAR || 
|- id="2004 TN20" bgcolor=#FFC2E0
| 8 ||  || ATE || 24.9 || data-sort-value="0.037" | 37 m || single || 3 days || 18 Oct 2004 || 17 || align=left | Disc.: LINEAR || 
|- id="2004 TO20" bgcolor=#FFC2E0
| 6 ||  || APO || 23.4 || data-sort-value="0.074" | 74 m || single || 26 days || 10 Nov 2004 || 32 || align=left | Disc.: LINEARAMO at MPC || 
|- id="2004 TT20" bgcolor=#fefefe
| 0 ||  || MBA-I || 18.95 || data-sort-value="0.48" | 480 m || multiple || 1995–2021 || 08 Sep 2021 || 61 || align=left | Disc.: Spacewatch || 
|- id="2004 TK21" bgcolor=#d6d6d6
| 0 ||  || MBA-O || 16.55 || 2.7 km || multiple || 2004–2022 || 05 Jan 2022 || 152 || align=left | Disc.: NEAT || 
|- id="2004 TN21" bgcolor=#E9E9E9
| 0 ||  || MBA-M || 17.48 || 1.3 km || multiple || 2004–2021 || 27 Sep 2021 || 62 || align=left | Disc.: Apache PointAlt.: 2017 SO37 || 
|- id="2004 TQ21" bgcolor=#d6d6d6
| 0 ||  || MBA-O || 16.6 || 2.7 km || multiple || 2004–2020 || 08 Oct 2020 || 55 || align=left | Disc.: Spacewatch || 
|- id="2004 TX21" bgcolor=#d6d6d6
| 0 ||  || MBA-O || 16.75 || 2.5 km || multiple || 2004–2021 || 09 Nov 2021 || 119 || align=left | Disc.: Spacewatch || 
|- id="2004 TY21" bgcolor=#d6d6d6
| 1 ||  || MBA-O || 17.85 || 1.5 km || multiple || 2004–2021 || 11 Nov 2021 || 24 || align=left | Disc.: Spacewatch || 
|- id="2004 TD22" bgcolor=#E9E9E9
| 0 ||  || MBA-M || 18.09 || 1.0 km || multiple || 2004–2021 || 08 Sep 2021 || 38 || align=left | Disc.: Spacewatch || 
|- id="2004 TE22" bgcolor=#fefefe
| 2 ||  || MBA-I || 18.5 || data-sort-value="0.59" | 590 m || multiple || 2004–2018 || 09 Nov 2018 || 47 || align=left | Disc.: Spacewatch || 
|- id="2004 TN22" bgcolor=#fefefe
| 0 ||  || MBA-I || 18.1 || data-sort-value="0.71" | 710 m || multiple || 2004–2019 || 03 Dec 2019 || 43 || align=left | Disc.: SpacewatchAdded on 22 July 2020Alt.: 2015 TH286 || 
|- id="2004 TU22" bgcolor=#E9E9E9
| 0 ||  || MBA-M || 18.06 || 1.0 km || multiple || 2004–2021 || 30 Oct 2021 || 68 || align=left | Disc.: SpacewatchAdded on 5 November 2021 || 
|- id="2004 TW22" bgcolor=#d6d6d6
| 0 ||  || MBA-O || 17.1 || 2.1 km || multiple || 2004–2020 || 11 Sep 2020 || 65 || align=left | Disc.: SpacewatchAlt.: 2015 TE313 || 
|- id="2004 TX22" bgcolor=#fefefe
| 4 ||  || MBA-I || 19.7 || data-sort-value="0.34" | 340 m || multiple || 2004–2014 || 13 Oct 2014 || 18 || align=left | Disc.: SpacewatchAdded on 24 December 2021 || 
|- id="2004 TZ22" bgcolor=#d6d6d6
| 0 ||  || MBA-O || 17.18 || 2.0 km || multiple || 2004–2021 || 30 Oct 2021 || 80 || align=left | Disc.: SpacewatchAlt.: 2013 HG130 || 
|- id="2004 TH23" bgcolor=#E9E9E9
| 0 ||  || MBA-M || 17.48 || 1.3 km || multiple || 2002–2021 || 09 Nov 2021 || 105 || align=left | Disc.: Spacewatch || 
|- id="2004 TV23" bgcolor=#E9E9E9
| 0 ||  || MBA-M || 18.56 || data-sort-value="0.82" | 820 m || multiple || 2004–2021 || 09 Nov 2021 || 55 || align=left | Disc.: Spacewatch || 
|- id="2004 TG24" bgcolor=#E9E9E9
| 1 ||  || MBA-M || 18.5 || data-sort-value="0.84" | 840 m || multiple || 2004–2017 || 29 Aug 2017 || 35 || align=left | Disc.: Spacewatch || 
|- id="2004 TH24" bgcolor=#E9E9E9
| 4 ||  || MBA-M || 18.2 || 1.3 km || multiple || 2004–2013 || 22 Oct 2013 || 20 || align=left | Disc.: Spacewatch || 
|- id="2004 TL24" bgcolor=#d6d6d6
| 0 ||  || MBA-O || 16.6 || 2.7 km || multiple || 2004–2020 || 15 Dec 2020 || 103 || align=left | Disc.: SpacewatchAlt.: 2009 SD22 || 
|- id="2004 TP24" bgcolor=#E9E9E9
| 0 ||  || MBA-M || 18.44 || data-sort-value="0.86" | 860 m || multiple || 2000–2021 || 09 Nov 2021 || 54 || align=left | Disc.: Spacewatch || 
|- id="2004 TY24" bgcolor=#E9E9E9
| 0 ||  || MBA-M || 17.17 || 2.0 km || multiple || 2002–2021 || 15 May 2021 || 62 || align=left | Disc.: SpacewatchAdded on 11 May 2021 || 
|- id="2004 TZ24" bgcolor=#fefefe
| 0 ||  || MBA-I || 19.17 || data-sort-value="0.44" | 440 m || multiple || 2004–2021 || 01 Nov 2021 || 123 || align=left | Disc.: SpacewatchAlt.: 2014 OT209 || 
|- id="2004 TC25" bgcolor=#E9E9E9
| 0 ||  || MBA-M || 17.61 || 1.7 km || multiple || 2004–2021 || 03 May 2021 || 55 || align=left | Disc.: SpacewatchAdded on 22 July 2020Alt.: 2016 GJ136 || 
|- id="2004 TD25" bgcolor=#E9E9E9
| 0 ||  || MBA-M || 18.54 || data-sort-value="0.82" | 820 m || multiple || 2004–2021 || 27 Oct 2021 || 71 || align=left | Disc.: SpacewatchAdded on 11 May 2021Alt.: 2017 UC82 || 
|- id="2004 TE25" bgcolor=#fefefe
| 2 ||  || MBA-I || 18.5 || data-sort-value="0.59" | 590 m || multiple || 2004–2019 || 28 Nov 2019 || 39 || align=left | Disc.: SpacewatchAlt.: 2015 RS182 || 
|- id="2004 TU25" bgcolor=#E9E9E9
| 1 ||  || MBA-M || 17.6 || data-sort-value="0.90" | 900 m || multiple || 2004–2020 || 16 Oct 2020 || 70 || align=left | Disc.: Spacewatch || 
|- id="2004 TW25" bgcolor=#E9E9E9
| 2 ||  || MBA-M || 18.2 || data-sort-value="0.68" | 680 m || multiple || 2004–2020 || 16 Sep 2020 || 49 || align=left | Disc.: SpacewatchAlt.: 2008 RM20 || 
|- id="2004 TA26" bgcolor=#E9E9E9
| 3 ||  || MBA-M || 18.2 || data-sort-value="0.68" | 680 m || multiple || 2004–2021 || 12 Dec 2021 || 44 || align=left | Disc.: Spacewatch || 
|- id="2004 TB26" bgcolor=#fefefe
| 0 ||  || MBA-I || 18.5 || data-sort-value="0.59" | 590 m || multiple || 2004–2020 || 26 Jan 2020 || 56 || align=left | Disc.: SpacewatchAlt.: 2011 ST206 || 
|- id="2004 TD26" bgcolor=#E9E9E9
| – ||  || MBA-M || 19.2 || data-sort-value="0.61" | 610 m || single || 8 days || 12 Oct 2004 || 9 || align=left | Disc.: Spacewatch || 
|- id="2004 TQ26" bgcolor=#E9E9E9
| 2 ||  || MBA-M || 17.8 || data-sort-value="0.82" | 820 m || multiple || 2004–2020 || 29 Jun 2020 || 40 || align=left | Disc.: SpacewatchAlt.: 2008 SW37 || 
|- id="2004 TW26" bgcolor=#E9E9E9
| 0 ||  || MBA-M || 18.33 || data-sort-value="0.91" | 910 m || multiple || 2004–2021 || 11 Sep 2021 || 57 || align=left | Disc.: SpacewatchAlt.: 2013 WR101, 2017 SX103 || 
|- id="2004 TB27" bgcolor=#fefefe
| 1 ||  || MBA-I || 19.0 || data-sort-value="0.47" | 470 m || multiple || 2004–2018 || 14 Sep 2018 || 35 || align=left | Disc.: SpacewatchAlt.: 2011 UW3 || 
|- id="2004 TO27" bgcolor=#E9E9E9
| 0 ||  || MBA-M || 17.5 || 1.8 km || multiple || 2002–2021 || 08 Jun 2021 || 41 || align=left | Disc.: Spacewatch || 
|- id="2004 TR27" bgcolor=#fefefe
| 1 ||  || MBA-I || 18.7 || data-sort-value="0.54" | 540 m || multiple || 2004–2019 || 25 Sep 2019 || 36 || align=left | Disc.: Spacewatch || 
|- id="2004 TF28" bgcolor=#fefefe
| 0 ||  || MBA-I || 17.6 || data-sort-value="0.90" | 900 m || multiple || 2003–2021 || 15 Jun 2021 || 143 || align=left | Disc.: Spacewatch || 
|- id="2004 TL28" bgcolor=#E9E9E9
| 0 ||  || MBA-M || 17.0 || 2.2 km || multiple || 2002–2020 || 28 Apr 2020 || 139 || align=left | Disc.: Spacewatch || 
|- id="2004 TN28" bgcolor=#d6d6d6
| 3 ||  || MBA-O || 17.9 || 1.5 km || multiple || 2004–2014 || 03 Aug 2014 || 28 || align=left | Disc.: Spacewatch || 
|- id="2004 TR28" bgcolor=#E9E9E9
| 0 ||  || MBA-M || 17.94 || data-sort-value="0.77" | 770 m || multiple || 2000–2021 || 09 Dec 2021 || 84 || align=left | Disc.: Spacewatch || 
|- id="2004 TV28" bgcolor=#fefefe
| 1 ||  || MBA-I || 18.6 || data-sort-value="0.57" | 570 m || multiple || 2004–2019 || 22 Oct 2019 || 32 || align=left | Disc.: Spacewatch || 
|- id="2004 TD29" bgcolor=#E9E9E9
| 0 ||  || MBA-M || 18.18 || data-sort-value="0.97" | 970 m || multiple || 2004–2021 || 02 Oct 2021 || 60 || align=left | Disc.: Spacewatch || 
|- id="2004 TH29" bgcolor=#fefefe
| 0 ||  || MBA-I || 18.2 || data-sort-value="0.68" | 680 m || multiple || 2004–2019 || 25 Aug 2019 || 46 || align=left | Disc.: SpacewatchAlt.: 2008 UC59 || 
|- id="2004 TJ29" bgcolor=#fefefe
| 3 ||  || MBA-I || 19.2 || data-sort-value="0.43" | 430 m || multiple || 2004–2019 || 24 Oct 2019 || 31 || align=left | Disc.: Spacewatch || 
|- id="2004 TN29" bgcolor=#fefefe
| 0 ||  || MBA-I || 18.56 || data-sort-value="0.58" | 580 m || multiple || 2004–2021 || 19 Nov 2021 || 71 || align=left | Disc.: SpacewatchAlt.: 2014 OJ274 || 
|- id="2004 TS29" bgcolor=#fefefe
| E ||  || MBA-I || 19.3 || data-sort-value="0.41" | 410 m || single || 5 days || 09 Oct 2004 || 9 || align=left | Disc.: Spacewatch || 
|- id="2004 TT29" bgcolor=#fefefe
| 0 ||  || MBA-I || 18.4 || data-sort-value="0.62" | 620 m || multiple || 2004–2020 || 04 Jan 2020 || 47 || align=left | Disc.: SpacewatchAlt.: 2015 UY72 || 
|- id="2004 TW29" bgcolor=#E9E9E9
| 0 ||  || MBA-M || 17.1 || 1.6 km || multiple || 2004–2020 || 15 Jun 2020 || 63 || align=left | Disc.: SpacewatchAlt.: 2015 FG177 || 
|- id="2004 TZ29" bgcolor=#d6d6d6
| – ||  || MBA-O || 17.3 || 1.9 km || single || 11 days || 15 Oct 2004 || 10 || align=left | Disc.: Spacewatch || 
|- id="2004 TA30" bgcolor=#fefefe
| 0 ||  || MBA-I || 18.8 || data-sort-value="0.52" | 520 m || multiple || 2004–2018 || 12 Jul 2018 || 37 || align=left | Disc.: SpacewatchAlt.: 2004 TM364, 2004 TT364, 2015 WW3 || 
|- id="2004 TC30" bgcolor=#E9E9E9
| – ||  || MBA-M || 18.5 || data-sort-value="0.59" | 590 m || single || 30 days || 03 Nov 2004 || 12 || align=left | Disc.: Spacewatch || 
|- id="2004 TE30" bgcolor=#fefefe
| 1 ||  || MBA-I || 18.8 || data-sort-value="0.52" | 520 m || multiple || 2004–2019 || 17 Dec 2019 || 29 || align=left | Disc.: Spacewatch || 
|- id="2004 TP30" bgcolor=#E9E9E9
| 1 ||  || MBA-M || 17.8 || data-sort-value="0.82" | 820 m || multiple || 2000–2020 || 17 Oct 2020 || 126 || align=left | Disc.: Spacewatch || 
|- id="2004 TT30" bgcolor=#E9E9E9
| 0 ||  || MBA-M || 18.33 || data-sort-value="0.64" | 640 m || multiple || 2004–2021 || 29 Nov 2021 || 36 || align=left | Disc.: SpacewatchAdded on 24 August 2020 || 
|- id="2004 TC31" bgcolor=#d6d6d6
| 0 ||  || MBA-O || 16.71 || 2.5 km || multiple || 1999–2022 || 26 Jan 2022 || 126 || align=left | Disc.: Spacewatch || 
|- id="2004 TO31" bgcolor=#E9E9E9
| 0 ||  || MBA-M || 18.15 || data-sort-value="0.70" | 700 m || multiple || 2004–2022 || 25 Jan 2022 || 102 || align=left | Disc.: Spacewatch || 
|- id="2004 TV31" bgcolor=#E9E9E9
| 0 ||  || MBA-M || 17.60 || 1.7 km || multiple || 1999–2021 || 02 Jul 2021 || 142 || align=left | Disc.: Spacewatch || 
|- id="2004 TJ33" bgcolor=#d6d6d6
| 0 ||  || MBA-O || 16.85 || 2.4 km || multiple || 2004–2022 || 25 Jan 2022 || 94 || align=left | Disc.: SpacewatchAlt.: 2015 XE157 || 
|- id="2004 TR33" bgcolor=#E9E9E9
| 0 ||  || MBA-M || 17.77 || 1.2 km || multiple || 2004–2021 || 07 Aug 2021 || 84 || align=left | Disc.: Spacewatch || 
|- id="2004 TZ33" bgcolor=#FA8072
| 0 ||  || MCA || 18.5 || data-sort-value="0.59" | 590 m || multiple || 2004–2020 || 15 Jun 2020 || 72 || align=left | Disc.: LONEOS || 
|- id="2004 TF34" bgcolor=#E9E9E9
| 0 ||  || MBA-M || 17.96 || 1.1 km || multiple || 2004–2021 || 27 Sep 2021 || 53 || align=left | Disc.: Spacewatch || 
|- id="2004 TQ34" bgcolor=#fefefe
| 0 ||  || MBA-I || 18.5 || data-sort-value="0.59" | 590 m || multiple || 2004–2020 || 02 Feb 2020 || 39 || align=left | Disc.: Spacewatch || 
|- id="2004 TD35" bgcolor=#E9E9E9
| – ||  || MBA-M || 18.9 || data-sort-value="0.49" | 490 m || single || 8 days || 12 Oct 2004 || 9 || align=left | Disc.: Spacewatch || 
|- id="2004 TR35" bgcolor=#fefefe
| 2 ||  || MBA-I || 18.1 || data-sort-value="0.71" | 710 m || multiple || 2004–2019 || 01 Nov 2019 || 49 || align=left | Disc.: Spacewatch || 
|- id="2004 TU35" bgcolor=#fefefe
| 2 ||  || MBA-I || 18.7 || data-sort-value="0.54" | 540 m || multiple || 2004–2019 || 05 Nov 2019 || 53 || align=left | Disc.: Spacewatch || 
|- id="2004 TH36" bgcolor=#E9E9E9
| 3 ||  || MBA-M || 18.6 || 1.1 km || multiple || 1995–2013 || 30 Oct 2013 || 39 || align=left | Disc.: SpacewatchAlt.: 2013 RB91 || 
|- id="2004 TJ36" bgcolor=#d6d6d6
| 0 ||  || MBA-O || 17.82 || 1.5 km || multiple || 2004–2021 || 30 Nov 2021 || 68 || align=left | Disc.: SpacewatchAlt.: 2015 TH76 || 
|- id="2004 TP36" bgcolor=#fefefe
| 0 ||  || MBA-I || 19.1 || data-sort-value="0.45" | 450 m || multiple || 2004–2020 || 14 May 2020 || 54 || align=left | Disc.: SpacewatchAdded on 22 July 2020 || 
|- id="2004 TZ36" bgcolor=#E9E9E9
| 0 ||  || MBA-M || 18.1 || data-sort-value="0.71" | 710 m || multiple || 2004–2019 || 03 Apr 2019 || 33 || align=left | Disc.: Spacewatch || 
|- id="2004 TA37" bgcolor=#d6d6d6
| 0 ||  || MBA-O || 17.17 || 2.0 km || multiple || 2004–2022 || 22 Jan 2022 || 59 || align=left | Disc.: Spacewatch || 
|- id="2004 TH37" bgcolor=#fefefe
| 0 ||  || MBA-I || 18.5 || data-sort-value="0.59" | 590 m || multiple || 2000–2019 || 02 Nov 2019 || 60 || align=left | Disc.: SpacewatchAlt.: 2019 SP44 || 
|- id="2004 TX37" bgcolor=#FFC2E0
| 0 ||  || AMO || 15.57 || 2.7 km || multiple || 2004–2021 || 13 Sep 2021 || 75 || align=left | Disc.: SpacewatchNEO larger than 1 kilometerAlt.: 2010 RB146, 2016 TB42 || 
|- id="2004 TA38" bgcolor=#E9E9E9
| 1 ||  || MBA-M || 17.6 || 1.3 km || multiple || 2002–2017 || 25 Nov 2017 || 84 || align=left | Disc.: SpacewatchAlt.: 2017 SL115 || 
|- id="2004 TF38" bgcolor=#E9E9E9
| 0 ||  || MBA-M || 17.90 || 1.1 km || multiple || 2004–2021 || 27 Oct 2021 || 100 || align=left | Disc.: Spacewatch || 
|- id="2004 TH38" bgcolor=#fefefe
| 3 ||  || MBA-I || 19.2 || data-sort-value="0.43" | 430 m || multiple || 2004–2018 || 03 Oct 2018 || 20 || align=left | Disc.: Spacewatch || 
|- id="2004 TN38" bgcolor=#E9E9E9
| 0 ||  || MBA-M || 18.34 || data-sort-value="0.90" | 900 m || multiple || 2004–2021 || 30 Oct 2021 || 94 || align=left | Disc.: Spacewatch || 
|- id="2004 TQ38" bgcolor=#fefefe
| 0 ||  || MBA-I || 18.1 || data-sort-value="0.71" | 710 m || multiple || 2004–2020 || 22 Mar 2020 || 82 || align=left | Disc.: SpacewatchAlt.: 2011 SH155 || 
|- id="2004 TZ38" bgcolor=#E9E9E9
| 1 ||  || MBA-M || 19.07 || data-sort-value="0.65" | 650 m || multiple || 2004–2021 || 27 Oct 2021 || 46 || align=left | Disc.: Spacewatch || 
|- id="2004 TH39" bgcolor=#fefefe
| 1 ||  || MBA-I || 18.7 || data-sort-value="0.54" | 540 m || multiple || 2000–2019 || 22 Oct 2019 || 53 || align=left | Disc.: Spacewatch || 
|- id="2004 TJ39" bgcolor=#fefefe
| 1 ||  || MBA-I || 17.5 || data-sort-value="0.94" | 940 m || multiple || 2003–2020 || 04 Jan 2020 || 185 || align=left | Disc.: SpacewatchAlt.: 2015 TK100 || 
|- id="2004 TT39" bgcolor=#fefefe
| 0 ||  || MBA-I || 19.7 || data-sort-value="0.34" | 340 m || multiple || 2004–2017 || 17 Aug 2017 || 33 || align=left | Disc.: LPL/Spacewatch II || 
|- id="2004 TU39" bgcolor=#E9E9E9
| 0 ||  || MBA-M || 17.75 || 1.2 km || multiple || 2004–2021 || 27 Oct 2021 || 155 || align=left | Disc.: LPL/Spacewatch IIAlt.: 2013 XF17 || 
|- id="2004 TV39" bgcolor=#E9E9E9
| 0 ||  || MBA-M || 17.4 || 1.8 km || multiple || 2004–2020 || 14 Feb 2020 || 60 || align=left | Disc.: LPL/Spacewatch IIAdded on 22 July 2020Alt.: 2009 WF87, 2018 VG89 || 
|- id="2004 TX39" bgcolor=#fefefe
| 0 ||  || MBA-I || 18.7 || data-sort-value="0.54" | 540 m || multiple || 2004–2021 || 19 Feb 2021 || 146 || align=left | Disc.: LPL/Spacewatch IIAdded on 17 June 2021Alt.: 2019 QU9 || 
|- id="2004 TD40" bgcolor=#E9E9E9
| 0 ||  || MBA-M || 17.80 || 1.2 km || multiple || 2004–2021 || 29 Oct 2021 || 100 || align=left | Disc.: LPL/Spacewatch II || 
|- id="2004 TG40" bgcolor=#E9E9E9
| 0 ||  || MBA-M || 17.2 || 2.0 km || multiple || 2002–2020 || 19 Apr 2020 || 65 || align=left | Disc.: LPL/Spacewatch II || 
|- id="2004 TK40" bgcolor=#fefefe
| 0 ||  || MBA-I || 18.64 || data-sort-value="0.56" | 560 m || multiple || 2004–2021 || 15 Apr 2021 || 54 || align=left | Disc.: LPL/Spacewatch II || 
|- id="2004 TW40" bgcolor=#fefefe
| 0 ||  || MBA-I || 18.4 || data-sort-value="0.62" | 620 m || multiple || 2004–2021 || 15 Jun 2021 || 98 || align=left | Disc.: LPL/Spacewatch II || 
|- id="2004 TZ40" bgcolor=#fefefe
| 3 ||  || MBA-I || 18.9 || data-sort-value="0.49" | 490 m || multiple || 2004–2015 || 23 Oct 2015 || 27 || align=left | Disc.: LPL/Spacewatch II || 
|- id="2004 TY41" bgcolor=#E9E9E9
| 0 ||  || MBA-M || 17.8 || 1.5 km || multiple || 2004–2019 || 05 Feb 2019 || 31 || align=left | Disc.: Spacewatch || 
|- id="2004 TL42" bgcolor=#fefefe
| 0 ||  || MBA-I || 18.85 || data-sort-value="0.50" | 500 m || multiple || 2004–2022 || 10 Jan 2022 || 70 || align=left | Disc.: SpacewatchAlt.: 2014 SZ264 || 
|- id="2004 TS42" bgcolor=#d6d6d6
| 0 ||  || MBA-O || 16.8 || 2.4 km || multiple || 1999–2021 || 15 Jan 2021 || 81 || align=left | Disc.: SpacewatchAdded on 17 January 2021Alt.: 2020 XM13 || 
|- id="2004 TU42" bgcolor=#E9E9E9
| 3 ||  || MBA-M || 18.5 || data-sort-value="0.84" | 840 m || multiple || 2004–2021 || 28 Nov 2021 || 35 || align=left | Disc.: SpacewatchAdded on 24 December 2021 || 
|- id="2004 TH43" bgcolor=#E9E9E9
| 0 ||  || MBA-M || 17.97 || data-sort-value="0.76" | 760 m || multiple || 2004–2021 || 01 Dec 2021 || 36 || align=left | Disc.: Spacewatch || 
|- id="2004 TP43" bgcolor=#fefefe
| 2 ||  || MBA-I || 18.7 || data-sort-value="0.54" | 540 m || multiple || 2004–2015 || 08 Nov 2015 || 77 || align=left | Disc.: Spacewatch || 
|- id="2004 TE44" bgcolor=#fefefe
| 0 ||  || MBA-I || 17.99 || data-sort-value="0.75" | 750 m || multiple || 2004–2021 || 13 May 2021 || 119 || align=left | Disc.: Spacewatch || 
|- id="2004 TJ45" bgcolor=#fefefe
| 0 ||  || MBA-I || 18.1 || data-sort-value="0.71" | 710 m || multiple || 2000–2019 || 19 Dec 2019 || 123 || align=left | Disc.: SpacewatchAlt.: 2015 RN58 || 
|- id="2004 TP46" bgcolor=#E9E9E9
| 0 ||  || MBA-M || 16.6 || 2.7 km || multiple || 1995–2020 || 22 Apr 2020 || 106 || align=left | Disc.: Spacewatch || 
|- id="2004 TR46" bgcolor=#fefefe
| 0 ||  || MBA-I || 17.86 || data-sort-value="0.80" | 800 m || multiple || 2003–2021 || 12 May 2021 || 86 || align=left | Disc.: SpacewatchAlt.: 2011 SK252 || 
|- id="2004 TB47" bgcolor=#E9E9E9
| 0 ||  || MBA-M || 17.4 || 1.8 km || multiple || 2004–2021 || 10 Apr 2021 || 57 || align=left | Disc.: Spacewatch || 
|- id="2004 TC47" bgcolor=#fefefe
| 0 ||  || MBA-I || 18.1 || data-sort-value="0.71" | 710 m || multiple || 2004–2020 || 20 Jan 2020 || 73 || align=left | Disc.: Spacewatch || 
|- id="2004 TL47" bgcolor=#E9E9E9
| 0 ||  || MBA-M || 18.00 || 1.1 km || multiple || 2003–2021 || 12 Jun 2021 || 44 || align=left | Disc.: Spacewatch || 
|- id="2004 TM47" bgcolor=#fefefe
| 0 ||  || MBA-I || 17.9 || data-sort-value="0.78" | 780 m || multiple || 2004–2020 || 19 Jan 2020 || 107 || align=left | Disc.: Spacewatch || 
|- id="2004 TS47" bgcolor=#fefefe
| 0 ||  || MBA-I || 18.2 || data-sort-value="0.68" | 680 m || multiple || 2004–2020 || 27 Jan 2020 || 47 || align=left | Disc.: Spacewatch || 
|- id="2004 TH48" bgcolor=#fefefe
| 0 ||  || MBA-I || 18.0 || data-sort-value="0.75" | 750 m || multiple || 2004–2019 || 24 Oct 2019 || 68 || align=left | Disc.: Spacewatch || 
|- id="2004 TK48" bgcolor=#E9E9E9
| 0 ||  || MBA-M || 17.56 || 1.3 km || multiple || 2004–2021 || 23 Oct 2021 || 77 || align=left | Disc.: Spacewatch || 
|- id="2004 TC49" bgcolor=#fefefe
| 0 ||  || MBA-I || 18.0 || data-sort-value="0.75" | 750 m || multiple || 2004–2018 || 24 Apr 2018 || 72 || align=left | Disc.: SpacewatchAlt.: 2011 OM || 
|- id="2004 TR49" bgcolor=#d6d6d6
| 0 ||  || MBA-O || 17.5 || 1.8 km || multiple || 2004–2021 || 11 Jan 2021 || 89 || align=left | Disc.: SpacewatchAdded on 22 July 2020 || 
|- id="2004 TK51" bgcolor=#E9E9E9
| 0 ||  || MBA-M || 17.86 || 1.1 km || multiple || 2000–2021 || 09 Nov 2021 || 85 || align=left | Disc.: Spacewatch || 
|- id="2004 TX52" bgcolor=#d6d6d6
| 0 ||  || MBA-O || 16.93 || 2.3 km || multiple || 2004–2022 || 05 Jan 2022 || 94 || align=left | Disc.: Spacewatch || 
|- id="2004 TL54" bgcolor=#fefefe
| 0 ||  || MBA-I || 18.70 || data-sort-value="0.54" | 540 m || multiple || 2004–2021 || 07 Sep 2021 || 92 || align=left | Disc.: SpacewatchAlt.: 2011 WC112 || 
|- id="2004 TY55" bgcolor=#fefefe
| 1 ||  || MBA-I || 18.5 || data-sort-value="0.59" | 590 m || multiple || 2004–2020 || 15 Feb 2020 || 49 || align=left | Disc.: Spacewatch || 
|- id="2004 TQ56" bgcolor=#fefefe
| 0 ||  || MBA-I || 18.3 || data-sort-value="0.65" | 650 m || multiple || 2004–2020 || 17 Nov 2020 || 164 || align=left | Disc.: Spacewatch || 
|- id="2004 TU56" bgcolor=#fefefe
| 0 ||  || MBA-I || 18.80 || data-sort-value="0.52" | 520 m || multiple || 2004–2021 || 07 Apr 2021 || 72 || align=left | Disc.: SpacewatchAlt.: 2008 WY116 || 
|- id="2004 TX56" bgcolor=#E9E9E9
| 0 ||  || MBA-M || 18.5 || data-sort-value="0.84" | 840 m || multiple || 2001–2019 || 03 Apr 2019 || 36 || align=left | Disc.: Spacewatch || 
|- id="2004 TG57" bgcolor=#d6d6d6
| 0 ||  || MBA-O || 17.4 || 1.8 km || multiple || 2002–2020 || 16 Oct 2020 || 63 || align=left | Disc.: SpacewatchAdded on 19 October 2020 || 
|- id="2004 TP57" bgcolor=#E9E9E9
| 0 ||  || MBA-M || 17.53 || 1.7 km || multiple || 2004–2021 || 15 Apr 2021 || 61 || align=left | Disc.: Spacewatch || 
|- id="2004 TQ57" bgcolor=#fefefe
| 1 ||  || MBA-I || 17.9 || data-sort-value="0.78" | 780 m || multiple || 2004–2019 || 02 Oct 2019 || 44 || align=left | Disc.: Spacewatch || 
|- id="2004 TR57" bgcolor=#d6d6d6
| 0 ||  || MBA-O || 17.08 || 2.1 km || multiple || 2004–2021 || 25 Nov 2021 || 87 || align=left | Disc.: SpacewatchAlt.: 2010 WM3 || 
|- id="2004 TT57" bgcolor=#fefefe
| 0 ||  || MBA-I || 19.15 || data-sort-value="0.44" | 440 m || multiple || 2004–2021 || 04 May 2021 || 32 || align=left | Disc.: SpacewatchAdded on 5 November 2021 || 
|- id="2004 TW57" bgcolor=#E9E9E9
| 0 ||  || MBA-M || 17.04 || 1.2 km || multiple || 2004–2021 || 27 Nov 2021 || 66 || align=left | Disc.: Spacewatch || 
|- id="2004 TM58" bgcolor=#E9E9E9
| 2 ||  || MBA-M || 19.18 || data-sort-value="0.61" | 610 m || multiple || 2004–2021 || 29 Nov 2021 || 46 || align=left | Disc.: Spacewatch || 
|- id="2004 TP58" bgcolor=#fefefe
| 0 ||  || MBA-I || 18.6 || data-sort-value="0.57" | 570 m || multiple || 2000–2019 || 02 Nov 2019 || 59 || align=left | Disc.: Spacewatch || 
|- id="2004 TT58" bgcolor=#E9E9E9
| – ||  || MBA-M || 17.6 || 1.3 km || single || 29 days || 03 Nov 2004 || 16 || align=left | Disc.: Spacewatch || 
|- id="2004 TV58" bgcolor=#fefefe
| 0 ||  || MBA-I || 18.90 || data-sort-value="0.49" | 490 m || multiple || 2004–2021 || 31 Oct 2021 || 53 || align=left | Disc.: SpacewatchAlt.: 2014 SZ110 || 
|- id="2004 TZ58" bgcolor=#E9E9E9
| 0 ||  || MBA-M || 18.62 || data-sort-value="0.79" | 790 m || multiple || 2004–2021 || 26 Nov 2021 || 99 || align=left | Disc.: SpacewatchAlt.: 2021 RN97 || 
|- id="2004 TB59" bgcolor=#E9E9E9
| 0 ||  || MBA-M || 18.30 || data-sort-value="0.92" | 920 m || multiple || 2004–2021 || 24 Nov 2021 || 72 || align=left | Disc.: SpacewatchAdded on 17 June 2021 || 
|- id="2004 TG59" bgcolor=#d6d6d6
| 2 ||  || MBA-O || 18.2 || 1.3 km || multiple || 1999–2019 || 25 Oct 2019 || 41 || align=left | Disc.: SpacewatchAlt.: 2009 SB178 || 
|- id="2004 TH59" bgcolor=#fefefe
| 1 ||  || MBA-I || 18.97 || data-sort-value="0.48" | 480 m || multiple || 2004–2021 || 07 Nov 2021 || 42 || align=left | Disc.: Spacewatch || 
|- id="2004 TL62" bgcolor=#E9E9E9
| 0 ||  || MBA-M || 17.72 || 1.2 km || multiple || 2004–2021 || 28 Nov 2021 || 103 || align=left | Disc.: Spacewatch || 
|- id="2004 TS62" bgcolor=#d6d6d6
| 1 ||  || MBA-O || 17.85 || 1.5 km || multiple || 2004–2021 || 08 Dec 2021 || 45 || align=left | Disc.: Spacewatch || 
|- id="2004 TD63" bgcolor=#E9E9E9
| 0 ||  || MBA-M || 17.71 || 1.2 km || multiple || 2004–2021 || 29 Oct 2021 || 90 || align=left | Disc.: Spacewatch || 
|- id="2004 TH63" bgcolor=#d6d6d6
| 0 ||  || MBA-O || 17.03 || 2.2 km || multiple || 2002–2022 || 27 Jan 2022 || 55 || align=left | Disc.: SpacewatchAdded on 9 March 2021Alt.: 2014 SM177 || 
|- id="2004 TN63" bgcolor=#fefefe
| 5 ||  || MBA-I || 18.6 || data-sort-value="0.57" | 570 m || multiple || 2004–2015 || 23 Oct 2015 || 31 || align=left | Disc.: Spacewatch || 
|- id="2004 TX63" bgcolor=#E9E9E9
| 0 ||  || MBA-M || 18.41 || data-sort-value="0.87" | 870 m || multiple || 2004–2021 || 30 Oct 2021 || 101 || align=left | Disc.: Spacewatch || 
|- id="2004 TC64" bgcolor=#E9E9E9
| 0 ||  || MBA-M || 17.43 || 1.4 km || multiple || 2004–2021 || 09 Nov 2021 || 155 || align=left | Disc.: LPL/Spacewatch II || 
|- id="2004 TD64" bgcolor=#E9E9E9
| 0 ||  || MBA-M || 17.67 || 1.2 km || multiple || 2004–2021 || 09 Dec 2021 || 84 || align=left | Disc.: Spacewatch || 
|- id="2004 TF64" bgcolor=#fefefe
| 1 ||  || MBA-I || 18.0 || data-sort-value="0.75" | 750 m || multiple || 2004–2019 || 27 Oct 2019 || 47 || align=left | Disc.: SpacewatchAlt.: 2008 US36 || 
|- id="2004 TK64" bgcolor=#fefefe
| 5 ||  || MBA-I || 19.7 || data-sort-value="0.34" | 340 m || multiple || 2004–2014 || 28 Oct 2014 || 16 || align=left | Disc.: SpacewatchAlt.: 2014 UH128 || 
|- id="2004 TO64" bgcolor=#d6d6d6
| 0 ||  || MBA-O || 17.1 || 2.1 km || multiple || 2004–2020 || 27 Jan 2020 || 38 || align=left | Disc.: SpacewatchAlt.: 2009 WR134 || 
|- id="2004 TS64" bgcolor=#E9E9E9
| 0 ||  || MBA-M || 17.46 || data-sort-value="0.96" | 960 m || multiple || 2000–2021 || 12 Dec 2021 || 71 || align=left | Disc.: SpacewatchAlt.: 2008 RL132 || 
|- id="2004 TT64" bgcolor=#fefefe
| 0 ||  || MBA-I || 18.86 || data-sort-value="0.50" | 500 m || multiple || 2004–2021 || 03 Oct 2021 || 62 || align=left | Disc.: SpacewatchAdded on 21 August 2021 || 
|- id="2004 TX64" bgcolor=#E9E9E9
| 0 ||  || MBA-M || 17.65 || 1.2 km || multiple || 2004–2021 || 27 Nov 2021 || 178 || align=left | Disc.: SpacewatchAlt.: 2014 AS2 || 
|- id="2004 TB65" bgcolor=#d6d6d6
| 0 ||  || MBA-O || 17.3 || 1.9 km || multiple || 2002–2021 || 30 Nov 2021 || 46 || align=left | Disc.: LPL/Spacewatch IIAdded on 24 December 2021 || 
|- id="2004 TC65" bgcolor=#fefefe
| 1 ||  || MBA-I || 18.5 || data-sort-value="0.59" | 590 m || multiple || 2004–2020 || 04 Jan 2020 || 99 || align=left | Disc.: SpacewatchAlt.: 2004 TX363, 2015 TH221 || 
|- id="2004 TF65" bgcolor=#fefefe
| 0 ||  || MBA-I || 18.12 || data-sort-value="0.71" | 710 m || multiple || 2004–2021 || 10 Sep 2021 || 170 || align=left | Disc.: NEATAlt.: 2011 UZ253 || 
|- id="2004 TH66" bgcolor=#FA8072
| 0 ||  || MCA || 18.59 || data-sort-value="0.57" | 570 m || multiple || 2004–2020 || 20 Dec 2020 || 126 || align=left | Disc.: LONEOSAlt.: 2020 OU37 || 
|- id="2004 TN70" bgcolor=#d6d6d6
| 0 ||  || MBA-O || 17.5 || 1.8 km || multiple || 2004–2020 || 10 Dec 2020 || 48 || align=left | Disc.: LPL/Spacewatch IIAlt.: 2014 QN194 || 
|- id="2004 TQ70" bgcolor=#fefefe
| 0 ||  || MBA-I || 18.5 || data-sort-value="0.59" | 590 m || multiple || 2000–2019 || 28 Aug 2019 || 45 || align=left | Disc.: LPL/Spacewatch IIAlt.: 2017 BE26 || 
|- id="2004 TR70" bgcolor=#fefefe
| 0 ||  || MBA-I || 18.95 || data-sort-value="0.48" | 480 m || multiple || 2004–2021 || 30 Nov 2021 || 86 || align=left | Disc.: LPL/Spacewatch IIAlt.: 2014 SF91 || 
|- id="2004 TV70" bgcolor=#fefefe
| 0 ||  || MBA-I || 18.6 || data-sort-value="0.57" | 570 m || multiple || 2004–2019 || 22 Oct 2019 || 34 || align=left | Disc.: LPL/Spacewatch IIAdded on 22 July 2020 || 
|- id="2004 TX70" bgcolor=#d6d6d6
| 0 ||  || MBA-O || 16.96 || 2.3 km || multiple || 2004–2021 || 25 Nov 2021 || 53 || align=left | Disc.: LPL/Spacewatch IIAdded on 5 November 2021 || 
|- id="2004 TJ71" bgcolor=#d6d6d6
| 0 ||  || MBA-O || 17.26 || 2.0 km || multiple || 2004–2020 || 05 Nov 2020 || 60 || align=left | Disc.: SpacewatchAlt.: 2020 QC12 || 
|- id="2004 TN71" bgcolor=#E9E9E9
| 1 ||  || MBA-M || 17.2 || 2.0 km || multiple || 2004–2020 || 21 Apr 2020 || 40 || align=left | Disc.: Spacewatch || 
|- id="2004 TY71" bgcolor=#E9E9E9
| 0 ||  || MBA-M || 17.89 || 1.1 km || multiple || 2004–2021 || 26 Oct 2021 || 174 || align=left | Disc.: Spacewatch || 
|- id="2004 TC72" bgcolor=#fefefe
| 0 ||  || MBA-I || 18.17 || data-sort-value="0.69" | 690 m || multiple || 2004–2021 || 31 Mar 2021 || 74 || align=left | Disc.: SpacewatchAlt.: 2010 KV133 || 
|- id="2004 TX72" bgcolor=#fefefe
| 0 ||  || MBA-I || 18.3 || data-sort-value="0.65" | 650 m || multiple || 2004–2019 || 05 Oct 2019 || 66 || align=left | Disc.: LPL/Spacewatch IIAlt.: 2015 PQ78 || 
|- id="2004 TD73" bgcolor=#d6d6d6
| 0 ||  || MBA-O || 17.2 || 2.0 km || multiple || 2004–2020 || 07 Dec 2020 || 58 || align=left | Disc.: LPL/Spacewatch II || 
|- id="2004 TH73" bgcolor=#d6d6d6
| 0 ||  || MBA-O || 17.3 || 1.9 km || multiple || 2004–2020 || 23 Aug 2020 || 75 || align=left | Disc.: LPL/Spacewatch II || 
|- id="2004 TN73" bgcolor=#E9E9E9
| 0 ||  || MBA-M || 18.43 || data-sort-value="0.61" | 610 m || multiple || 2004–2022 || 25 Jan 2022 || 54 || align=left | Disc.: LPL/Spacewatch IIAdded on 19 October 2020Alt.: 2012 SK19 || 
|- id="2004 TQ73" bgcolor=#d6d6d6
| 0 ||  || MBA-O || 16.5 || 2.8 km || multiple || 2001–2021 || 05 Jan 2021 || 128 || align=left | Disc.: LPL/Spacewatch IIAlt.: 2006 BB3, 2009 SM81, 2015 TT62 || 
|- id="2004 TJ74" bgcolor=#E9E9E9
| 0 ||  || MBA-M || 17.7 || 1.6 km || multiple || 2004–2020 || 20 Apr 2020 || 44 || align=left | Disc.: LPL/Spacewatch II || 
|- id="2004 TK74" bgcolor=#fefefe
| 0 ||  || MBA-I || 18.1 || data-sort-value="0.71" | 710 m || multiple || 2004–2015 || 04 Dec 2015 || 56 || align=left | Disc.: LPL/Spacewatch IIAlt.: 2011 QF56, 2014 HV135, 2015 XK14 || 
|- id="2004 TP74" bgcolor=#E9E9E9
| 0 ||  || MBA-M || 17.63 || 1.3 km || multiple || 2004–2021 || 28 Nov 2021 || 76 || align=left | Disc.: LPL/Spacewatch II || 
|- id="2004 TQ74" bgcolor=#E9E9E9
| 0 ||  || MBA-M || 17.64 || 1.2 km || multiple || 2004–2021 || 02 Dec 2021 || 137 || align=left | Disc.: LPL/Spacewatch II || 
|- id="2004 TR74" bgcolor=#FA8072
| 1 ||  || MCA || 19.57 || data-sort-value="0.36" | 360 m || multiple || 2004–2021 || 30 Nov 2021 || 50 || align=left | Disc.: LPL/Spacewatch IIAlt.: 2014 QW401 || 
|- id="2004 TU76" bgcolor=#fefefe
| – ||  || MBA-I || 19.0 || data-sort-value="0.47" | 470 m || single || 8 days || 15 Oct 2004 || 12 || align=left | Disc.: LPL/Spacewatch II || 
|- id="2004 TW76" bgcolor=#d6d6d6
| 1 ||  || MBA-O || 17.18 || 2.0 km || multiple || 2004–2021 || 04 Oct 2021 || 66 || align=left | Disc.: LPL/Spacewatch II || 
|- id="2004 TY76" bgcolor=#d6d6d6
| 0 ||  || MBA-O || 17.04 || 2.2 km || multiple || 2004–2022 || 04 Jan 2022 || 108 || align=left | Disc.: LPL/Spacewatch IIAlt.: 2015 TU197 || 
|- id="2004 TZ76" bgcolor=#d6d6d6
| 0 ||  || MBA-O || 17.25 || 2.0 km || multiple || 2004–2022 || 24 Jan 2022 || 104 || align=left | Disc.: LPL/Spacewatch IIAlt.: 2015 VK101 || 
|- id="2004 TD77" bgcolor=#E9E9E9
| 0 ||  || MBA-M || 17.37 || 1.9 km || multiple || 2002–2021 || 05 Jun 2021 || 126 || align=left | Disc.: LPL/Spacewatch II || 
|- id="2004 TM77" bgcolor=#fefefe
| 0 ||  || MBA-I || 18.71 || data-sort-value="0.54" | 540 m || multiple || 2004–2021 || 20 Mar 2021 || 90 || align=left | Disc.: LPL/Spacewatch II || 
|- id="2004 TR78" bgcolor=#d6d6d6
| 0 ||  || MBA-O || 17.13 || 2.1 km || multiple || 2004–2021 || 30 Oct 2021 || 87 || align=left | Disc.: LPL/Spacewatch IIAlt.: 2015 PH182 || 
|- id="2004 TS78" bgcolor=#d6d6d6
| 0 ||  || MBA-O || 17.5 || 1.8 km || multiple || 2004–2019 || 20 Dec 2019 || 80 || align=left | Disc.: LPL/Spacewatch IIAlt.: 2009 UL78 || 
|- id="2004 TY78" bgcolor=#fefefe
| 0 ||  || MBA-I || 19.04 || data-sort-value="0.46" | 460 m || multiple || 2004–2019 || 01 Nov 2019 || 69 || align=left | Disc.: LPL/Spacewatch II || 
|- id="2004 TN79" bgcolor=#E9E9E9
| 1 ||  || MBA-M || 18.27 || data-sort-value="0.93" | 930 m || multiple || 2004–2021 || 30 Nov 2021 || 106 || align=left | Disc.: SpacewatchAlt.: 2021 RJ23 || 
|- id="2004 TT79" bgcolor=#d6d6d6
| 0 ||  || MBA-O || 16.4 || 2.9 km || multiple || 1999–2020 || 22 Oct 2020 || 126 || align=left | Disc.: Spacewatch || 
|- id="2004 TV79" bgcolor=#d6d6d6
| 0 ||  || MBA-O || 16.14 || 3.3 km || multiple || 2004–2021 || 19 Nov 2021 || 171 || align=left | Disc.: SpacewatchAlt.: 2007 EV59, 2015 PE300 || 
|- id="2004 TB80" bgcolor=#fefefe
| 0 ||  || MBA-I || 18.9 || data-sort-value="0.49" | 490 m || multiple || 2001–2020 || 07 Oct 2020 || 88 || align=left | Disc.: Spacewatch || 
|- id="2004 TM80" bgcolor=#d6d6d6
| 0 ||  || MBA-O || 17.0 || 2.2 km || multiple || 1999–2020 || 11 Dec 2020 || 78 || align=left | Disc.: Spacewatch || 
|- id="2004 TP80" bgcolor=#fefefe
| 2 ||  || MBA-I || 18.6 || data-sort-value="0.57" | 570 m || multiple || 2004–2019 || 23 Jun 2019 || 43 || align=left | Disc.: SpacewatchAlt.: 2007 RZ225 || 
|- id="2004 TR80" bgcolor=#d6d6d6
| 0 ||  || MBA-O || 16.80 || 2.4 km || multiple || 2004–2022 || 27 Jan 2022 || 113 || align=left | Disc.: Spacewatch || 
|- id="2004 TS80" bgcolor=#E9E9E9
| – ||  || MBA-M || 18.0 || 1.1 km || single || 8 days || 13 Oct 2004 || 12 || align=left | Disc.: Spacewatch || 
|- id="2004 TY80" bgcolor=#fefefe
| 0 ||  || MBA-I || 18.7 || data-sort-value="0.54" | 540 m || multiple || 2004–2019 || 02 Oct 2019 || 33 || align=left | Disc.: Spacewatch || 
|- id="2004 TZ80" bgcolor=#fefefe
| 0 ||  || MBA-I || 19.1 || data-sort-value="0.45" | 450 m || multiple || 2004–2019 || 19 Dec 2019 || 52 || align=left | Disc.: Spacewatch || 
|- id="2004 TD81" bgcolor=#d6d6d6
| 0 ||  || MBA-O || 16.68 || 2.6 km || multiple || 2004–2021 || 25 Nov 2021 || 72 || align=left | Disc.: SpacewatchAdded on 17 June 2021 || 
|- id="2004 TG81" bgcolor=#E9E9E9
| 3 ||  || MBA-M || 17.7 || 1.6 km || multiple || 2004–2018 || 12 Nov 2018 || 65 || align=left | Disc.: SpacewatchAlt.: 2018 TP13 || 
|- id="2004 TK81" bgcolor=#fefefe
| 3 ||  || MBA-I || 19.2 || data-sort-value="0.43" | 430 m || multiple || 2004–2015 || 12 Sep 2015 || 19 || align=left | Disc.: Spacewatch || 
|- id="2004 TS81" bgcolor=#fefefe
| 0 ||  || MBA-I || 18.1 || data-sort-value="0.71" | 710 m || multiple || 2004–2021 || 16 Jan 2021 || 66 || align=left | Disc.: Spacewatch || 
|- id="2004 TV81" bgcolor=#fefefe
| 4 ||  || MBA-I || 19.3 || data-sort-value="0.41" | 410 m || multiple || 2004–2011 || 30 Aug 2011 || 15 || align=left | Disc.: Spacewatch || 
|- id="2004 TY81" bgcolor=#fefefe
| 0 ||  || MBA-I || 18.8 || data-sort-value="0.52" | 520 m || multiple || 2004–2020 || 23 Jun 2020 || 26 || align=left | Disc.: Spacewatch || 
|- id="2004 TZ81" bgcolor=#d6d6d6
| 0 ||  || MBA-O || 17.6 || 1.7 km || multiple || 2002–2020 || 16 Oct 2020 || 34 || align=left | Disc.: SpacewatchAdded on 17 January 2021 || 
|- id="2004 TB82" bgcolor=#d6d6d6
| 2 ||  || MBA-O || 17.9 || 1.5 km || multiple || 2004–2020 || 20 Oct 2020 || 35 || align=left | Disc.: SpacewatchAdded on 17 January 2021Alt.: 2020 PY13 || 
|- id="2004 TL82" bgcolor=#fefefe
| 2 ||  || MBA-I || 19.5 || data-sort-value="0.37" | 370 m || multiple || 2004–2021 || 06 Nov 2021 || 42 || align=left | Disc.: SpacewatchAdded on 29 January 2022 || 
|- id="2004 TO82" bgcolor=#d6d6d6
| 2 ||  || MBA-O || 17.5 || 1.8 km || multiple || 2004–2019 || 25 Sep 2019 || 32 || align=left | Disc.: Spacewatch || 
|- id="2004 TT82" bgcolor=#fefefe
| 0 ||  || MBA-I || 18.21 || data-sort-value="0.68" | 680 m || multiple || 2004–2021 || 12 May 2021 || 78 || align=left | Disc.: Spacewatch || 
|- id="2004 TB83" bgcolor=#E9E9E9
| 0 ||  || MBA-M || 17.8 || 1.5 km || multiple || 2004–2020 || 27 Jan 2020 || 76 || align=left | Disc.: SpacewatchAlt.: 2009 WG83 || 
|- id="2004 TC83" bgcolor=#d6d6d6
| 0 ||  || MBA-O || 17.32 || 1.9 km || multiple || 2004–2022 || 27 Jan 2022 || 79 || align=left | Disc.: Spacewatch || 
|- id="2004 TG83" bgcolor=#E9E9E9
| 0 ||  || MBA-M || 17.95 || data-sort-value="0.76" | 760 m || multiple || 2004–2021 || 08 Dec 2021 || 48 || align=left | Disc.: Spacewatch || 
|- id="2004 TH83" bgcolor=#fefefe
| 4 ||  || MBA-I || 19.4 || data-sort-value="0.39" | 390 m || multiple || 2004–2018 || 11 Nov 2018 || 28 || align=left | Disc.: SpacewatchAlt.: 2011 SH168 || 
|- id="2004 TW83" bgcolor=#E9E9E9
| – ||  || MBA-M || 18.8 || data-sort-value="0.52" | 520 m || single || 18 days || 12 Oct 2004 || 12 || align=left | Disc.: Spacewatch || 
|- id="2004 TY83" bgcolor=#E9E9E9
| 3 ||  || MBA-M || 20.1 || data-sort-value="0.40" | 400 m || multiple || 2004–2021 || 14 Nov 2021 || 38 || align=left | Disc.: Spacewatch || 
|- id="2004 TZ83" bgcolor=#fefefe
| 4 ||  || MBA-I || 19.4 || data-sort-value="0.39" | 390 m || multiple || 2004–2018 || 06 Oct 2018 || 32 || align=left | Disc.: SpacewatchAlt.: 2011 SS137 || 
|- id="2004 TE84" bgcolor=#E9E9E9
| 0 ||  || MBA-M || 17.82 || 1.1 km || multiple || 2004–2021 || 25 Nov 2021 || 63 || align=left | Disc.: Spacewatch || 
|- id="2004 TF84" bgcolor=#d6d6d6
| 0 ||  || MBA-O || 16.8 || 2.4 km || multiple || 2004–2021 || 18 Jan 2021 || 149 || align=left | Disc.: SpacewatchAlt.: 2005 YU23, 2011 AJ61 || 
|- id="2004 TK84" bgcolor=#E9E9E9
| 0 ||  || MBA-M || 18.00 || 1.1 km || multiple || 2004–2021 || 06 Nov 2021 || 77 || align=left | Disc.: Spacewatch || 
|- id="2004 TM84" bgcolor=#E9E9E9
| 2 ||  || MBA-M || 18.85 || data-sort-value="0.71" | 710 m || multiple || 2004–2021 || 16 Jul 2021 || 24 || align=left | Disc.: SpacewatchAdded on 22 July 2020 || 
|- id="2004 TS84" bgcolor=#E9E9E9
| 3 ||  || MBA-M || 18.0 || data-sort-value="0.75" | 750 m || multiple || 2004–2019 || 08 Apr 2019 || 28 || align=left | Disc.: Spacewatch || 
|- id="2004 TT84" bgcolor=#fefefe
| 4 ||  || MBA-I || 18.8 || data-sort-value="0.52" | 520 m || multiple || 2004–2015 || 04 Dec 2015 || 23 || align=left | Disc.: Spacewatch || 
|- id="2004 TJ85" bgcolor=#fefefe
| 0 ||  || MBA-I || 18.56 || data-sort-value="0.58" | 580 m || multiple || 2004–2021 || 13 Apr 2021 || 33 || align=left | Disc.: Spacewatch || 
|- id="2004 TK85" bgcolor=#E9E9E9
| – ||  || MBA-M || 18.4 || 1.2 km || single || 8 days || 13 Oct 2004 || 9 || align=left | Disc.: Spacewatch || 
|- id="2004 TY85" bgcolor=#fefefe
| 3 ||  || MBA-I || 19.1 || data-sort-value="0.45" | 450 m || multiple || 2004–2019 || 21 Oct 2019 || 35 || align=left | Disc.: Spacewatch || 
|- id="2004 TC86" bgcolor=#E9E9E9
| 0 ||  || MBA-M || 18.1 || 1.3 km || multiple || 2004–2018 || 13 Dec 2018 || 52 || align=left | Disc.: SpacewatchAlt.: 2018 VY69 || 
|- id="2004 TL86" bgcolor=#fefefe
| 1 ||  || MBA-I || 18.5 || data-sort-value="0.59" | 590 m || multiple || 2004–2018 || 05 Aug 2018 || 32 || align=left | Disc.: Spacewatch || 
|- id="2004 TU86" bgcolor=#fefefe
| 1 ||  || MBA-I || 18.8 || data-sort-value="0.52" | 520 m || multiple || 2004–2018 || 14 Aug 2018 || 45 || align=left | Disc.: Spacewatch || 
|- id="2004 TZ86" bgcolor=#E9E9E9
| 0 ||  || MBA-M || 17.3 || 1.5 km || multiple || 2004–2020 || 20 Apr 2020 || 58 || align=left | Disc.: Spacewatch || 
|- id="2004 TE87" bgcolor=#d6d6d6
| 0 ||  || MBA-O || 17.4 || 1.8 km || multiple || 2004–2020 || 19 Nov 2020 || 71 || align=left | Disc.: Spacewatch || 
|- id="2004 TK87" bgcolor=#fefefe
| 0 ||  || MBA-I || 19.0 || data-sort-value="0.47" | 470 m || multiple || 2004–2020 || 10 Dec 2020 || 53 || align=left | Disc.: SpacewatchAlt.: 2007 RE125 || 
|- id="2004 TS87" bgcolor=#E9E9E9
| 0 ||  || MBA-M || 18.45 || data-sort-value="0.86" | 860 m || multiple || 2004–2021 || 30 Nov 2021 || 91 || align=left | Disc.: Spacewatch || 
|- id="2004 TA88" bgcolor=#E9E9E9
| 0 ||  || MBA-M || 16.8 || 2.4 km || multiple || 2004–2021 || 14 Jun 2021 || 100 || align=left | Disc.: SpacewatchAlt.: 2004 TK364, 2014 WN354, 2018 UE16 || 
|- id="2004 TC88" bgcolor=#d6d6d6
| 0 ||  || MBA-O || 16.75 || 2.5 km || multiple || 2004–2022 || 25 Jan 2022 || 78 || align=left | Disc.: SpacewatchAdded on 17 January 2021 || 
|- id="2004 TH88" bgcolor=#fefefe
| 0 ||  || MBA-I || 18.95 || data-sort-value="0.48" | 480 m || multiple || 2004–2021 || 14 Jun 2021 || 35 || align=left | Disc.: Spacewatch || 
|- id="2004 TP88" bgcolor=#d6d6d6
| 0 ||  || MBA-O || 17.22 || 2.0 km || multiple || 2004–2021 || 02 Apr 2021 || 92 || align=left | Disc.: SpacewatchAlt.: 2014 TQ60 || 
|- id="2004 TS88" bgcolor=#fefefe
| 0 ||  || MBA-I || 18.3 || data-sort-value="0.65" | 650 m || multiple || 2004–2021 || 31 May 2021 || 47 || align=left | Disc.: SpacewatchAdded on 21 August 2021Alt.: 2021 JP49 || 
|- id="2004 TY88" bgcolor=#E9E9E9
| 0 ||  || MBA-M || 18.71 || data-sort-value="0.76" | 760 m || multiple || 2004–2021 || 09 Nov 2021 || 72 || align=left | Disc.: Spacewatch || 
|- id="2004 TE89" bgcolor=#fefefe
| 0 ||  || MBA-I || 17.9 || data-sort-value="0.78" | 780 m || multiple || 2004–2019 || 04 Oct 2019 || 76 || align=left | Disc.: Spacewatch || 
|- id="2004 TF89" bgcolor=#E9E9E9
| 0 ||  || MBA-M || 17.1 || 2.1 km || multiple || 2000–2020 || 23 Mar 2020 || 84 || align=left | Disc.: Spacewatch || 
|- id="2004 TH89" bgcolor=#E9E9E9
| 1 ||  || MBA-M || 18.40 || data-sort-value="0.88" | 880 m || multiple || 2004–2021 || 09 Nov 2021 || 50 || align=left | Disc.: SpacewatchAdded on 5 November 2021Alt.: 2021 QL62 || 
|- id="2004 TM89" bgcolor=#d6d6d6
| 0 ||  || MBA-O || 17.5 || 1.8 km || multiple || 2002–2020 || 20 Oct 2020 || 44 || align=left | Disc.: SpacewatchAlt.: 2009 SQ369 || 
|- id="2004 TN89" bgcolor=#E9E9E9
| 2 ||  || MBA-M || 19.2 || data-sort-value="0.43" | 430 m || multiple || 2004–2020 || 12 Sep 2020 || 30 || align=left | Disc.: Spacewatch || 
|- id="2004 TY89" bgcolor=#FA8072
| – ||  || MCA || 19.6 || data-sort-value="0.36" | 360 m || single || 21 days || 13 Oct 2004 || 12 || align=left | Disc.: Spacewatch || 
|- id="2004 TN90" bgcolor=#E9E9E9
| 2 ||  || MBA-M || 18.7 || 1.0 km || multiple || 2004–2018 || 13 Dec 2018 || 21 || align=left | Disc.: SpacewatchAdded on 19 October 2020 || 
|- id="2004 TP90" bgcolor=#fefefe
| – ||  || MBA-I || 18.9 || data-sort-value="0.49" | 490 m || single || 8 days || 13 Oct 2004 || 9 || align=left | Disc.: Spacewatch || 
|- id="2004 TY90" bgcolor=#d6d6d6
| 1 ||  || MBA-O || 17.0 || 2.2 km || multiple || 2004–2021 || 18 Jan 2021 || 97 || align=left | Disc.: SpacewatchAlt.: 2009 ST46 || 
|- id="2004 TZ90" bgcolor=#fefefe
| 0 ||  || MBA-I || 19.15 || data-sort-value="0.44" | 440 m || multiple || 2004–2022 || 25 Jan 2022 || 49 || align=left | Disc.: SpacewatchAlt.: 2014 WX89 || 
|- id="2004 TE91" bgcolor=#d6d6d6
| 0 ||  || MBA-O || 17.4 || 1.8 km || multiple || 2004–2021 || 06 Jan 2021 || 85 || align=left | Disc.: Spacewatch || 
|- id="2004 TG91" bgcolor=#E9E9E9
| 0 ||  || MBA-M || 17.70 || 1.2 km || multiple || 2004–2021 || 27 Nov 2021 || 98 || align=left | Disc.: Spacewatch || 
|- id="2004 TF92" bgcolor=#fefefe
| 0 ||  || MBA-I || 18.7 || data-sort-value="0.54" | 540 m || multiple || 2004–2020 || 14 Feb 2020 || 74 || align=left | Disc.: Spacewatch || 
|- id="2004 TW92" bgcolor=#fefefe
| 2 ||  || MBA-I || 19.3 || data-sort-value="0.41" | 410 m || multiple || 2004–2018 || 16 Sep 2018 || 34 || align=left | Disc.: Spacewatch || 
|- id="2004 TG93" bgcolor=#E9E9E9
| 0 ||  || MBA-M || 17.08 || 1.6 km || multiple || 2000–2021 || 28 Oct 2021 || 219 || align=left | Disc.: SpacewatchAlt.: 2015 BQ20, 2016 LF66 || 
|- id="2004 TU93" bgcolor=#fefefe
| 0 ||  || MBA-I || 18.61 || data-sort-value="0.56" | 560 m || multiple || 2004–2021 || 09 May 2021 || 56 || align=left | Disc.: Spacewatch || 
|- id="2004 TW93" bgcolor=#d6d6d6
| 3 ||  || MBA-O || 19.1 || data-sort-value="0.84" | 840 m || multiple || 2004–2015 || 13 Oct 2015 || 20 || align=left | Disc.: Spacewatch || 
|- id="2004 TG94" bgcolor=#fefefe
| 1 ||  || MBA-I || 18.9 || data-sort-value="0.49" | 490 m || multiple || 2004–2019 || 05 Oct 2019 || 42 || align=left | Disc.: Spacewatch || 
|- id="2004 TN94" bgcolor=#E9E9E9
| 0 ||  || MBA-M || 18.11 || 1.0 km || multiple || 2004–2021 || 30 Sep 2021 || 145 || align=left | Disc.: Spacewatch || 
|- id="2004 TO94" bgcolor=#fefefe
| 1 ||  || MBA-I || 18.7 || data-sort-value="0.54" | 540 m || multiple || 2004–2018 || 10 Oct 2018 || 56 || align=left | Disc.: SpacewatchAlt.: 2011 SP147 || 
|- id="2004 TR94" bgcolor=#E9E9E9
| – ||  || MBA-M || 17.8 || data-sort-value="0.82" | 820 m || single || 22 days || 09 Oct 2004 || 9 || align=left | Disc.: Spacewatch || 
|- id="2004 TX94" bgcolor=#d6d6d6
| 1 ||  || MBA-O || 17.5 || 1.8 km || multiple || 2004–2020 || 15 Oct 2020 || 78 || align=left | Disc.: SpacewatchAlt.: 2015 TF76 || 
|- id="2004 TO95" bgcolor=#d6d6d6
| 0 ||  || MBA-O || 16.8 || 2.4 km || multiple || 2004–2020 || 06 Dec 2020 || 92 || align=left | Disc.: Spacewatch || 
|- id="2004 TW95" bgcolor=#fefefe
| 0 ||  || MBA-I || 18.3 || data-sort-value="0.65" | 650 m || multiple || 2004–2019 || 03 Sep 2019 || 34 || align=left | Disc.: Spacewatch || 
|- id="2004 TB96" bgcolor=#d6d6d6
| 4 ||  || MBA-O || 18.9 || data-sort-value="0.92" | 920 m || multiple || 2004–2009 || 20 Aug 2009 || 15 || align=left | Disc.: SpacewatchAlt.: 2009 QF17 || 
|- id="2004 TJ96" bgcolor=#E9E9E9
| 2 ||  || MBA-M || 18.2 || data-sort-value="0.96" | 960 m || multiple || 2004–2021 || 02 Dec 2021 || 41 || align=left | Disc.: SpacewatchAdded on 24 December 2021 || 
|- id="2004 TL96" bgcolor=#fefefe
| 0 ||  || MBA-I || 18.0 || data-sort-value="0.75" | 750 m || multiple || 2004–2019 || 03 Dec 2019 || 69 || align=left | Disc.: Spacewatch || 
|- id="2004 TN96" bgcolor=#d6d6d6
| E ||  || MBA-O || 17.9 || 1.5 km || single || 4 days || 09 Oct 2004 || 9 || align=left | Disc.: Spacewatch || 
|- id="2004 TS96" bgcolor=#d6d6d6
| 0 ||  || MBA-O || 17.61 || 1.7 km || multiple || 2004–2021 || 06 Apr 2021 || 57 || align=left | Disc.: SpacewatchAlt.: 2014 WO216 || 
|- id="2004 TW96" bgcolor=#d6d6d6
| 2 ||  || MBA-O || 17.2 || 2.0 km || multiple || 2004–2021 || 18 Jan 2021 || 82 || align=left | Disc.: SpacewatchAlt.: 2009 RR51 || 
|- id="2004 TS97" bgcolor=#E9E9E9
| 0 ||  || MBA-M || 17.60 || 1.3 km || multiple || 2004–2021 || 30 Nov 2021 || 103 || align=left | Disc.: Spacewatch || 
|- id="2004 TX97" bgcolor=#E9E9E9
| 0 ||  || MBA-M || 17.47 || 1.8 km || multiple || 2004–2021 || 08 May 2021 || 92 || align=left | Disc.: Spacewatch || 
|- id="2004 TE98" bgcolor=#d6d6d6
| 0 ||  || MBA-O || 16.19 || 3.2 km || multiple || 2004–2022 || 22 Jan 2022 || 159 || align=left | Disc.: SpacewatchAlt.: 2014 OH336 || 
|- id="2004 TK98" bgcolor=#fefefe
| 0 ||  || MBA-I || 18.72 || data-sort-value="0.54" | 540 m || multiple || 2002–2021 || 07 Apr 2021 || 74 || align=left | Disc.: SpacewatchAlt.: 2013 CK41 || 
|- id="2004 TO98" bgcolor=#E9E9E9
| 0 ||  || MBA-M || 17.96 || 1.1 km || multiple || 2004–2021 || 29 Oct 2021 || 86 || align=left | Disc.: Spacewatch || 
|- id="2004 TS98" bgcolor=#E9E9E9
| 0 ||  || MBA-M || 17.3 || 1.5 km || multiple || 2004–2020 || 25 May 2020 || 65 || align=left | Disc.: SpacewatchAlt.: 2015 FX247 || 
|- id="2004 TU98" bgcolor=#E9E9E9
| 2 ||  || MBA-M || 18.0 || 1.1 km || multiple || 2004–2017 || 25 Nov 2017 || 36 || align=left | Disc.: SpacewatchAlt.: 2017 SL162 || 
|- id="2004 TB99" bgcolor=#d6d6d6
| 0 ||  || MBA-O || 16.93 || 2.3 km || multiple || 2004–2021 || 07 Feb 2021 || 100 || align=left | Disc.: Spacewatch || 
|- id="2004 TQ99" bgcolor=#E9E9E9
| 0 ||  || MBA-M || 17.4 || 1.8 km || multiple || 2004–2020 || 21 Apr 2020 || 51 || align=left | Disc.: Spacewatch || 
|- id="2004 TR99" bgcolor=#fefefe
| 3 ||  || MBA-I || 18.3 || data-sort-value="0.65" | 650 m || multiple || 2004–2020 || 22 Apr 2020 || 36 || align=left | Disc.: SpacewatchAlt.: 2011 UR271 || 
|- id="2004 TV99" bgcolor=#fefefe
| 0 ||  || MBA-I || 18.40 || data-sort-value="0.62" | 620 m || multiple || 2004–2021 || 08 May 2021 || 41 || align=left | Disc.: Spacewatch || 
|}
back to top

References 
 

Lists of unnumbered minor planets